Little Girl Lost may refer to:

Television
 "Little Girl Lost" (The Twilight Zone), an episode of the television series The Twilight Zone
 "Little Girl Lost", an episode of the TV series Mannix
 "Little Girl Lost", an episode of the TV series Bonanza
 "Little Girl Lost", an episode of the TV series Wagon Train
 "Little Girl Lost", an episode of the television series Cold Case Files
 "Little Girl Lost", an episode segment of the series Night Gallery, based on Tubb's short story below
 "Little Girl Lost", an episode of the television series The Inside
 "Little Girl Lost", an episode of the television series Superman: The Animated Series
 Little Girl Lost (film), a 1988 television movie
 Little Girl Lost: The Delimar Vera Story, a 2008 television movie

Music
 "Little Girl Lost", a 1972 song by Kris Kristofferson from the album Border Lord

Literature
 "Little Girl Lost", a short science fiction story by Edwin Charles Tubb
 Little Girl Lost, the debut novel by Richard Aleas (pseudonym of  Charles Ardai)
 "A Little Girl Lost", a 1794 poem by William Blake
 "The Little Girl Lost", another 1794 poem by William Blake
 Little Girl Lost, an autobiography by American actress Drew Barrymore